WorldMark by Wyndham (formerly Trendwest) is the developer and marketer of WorldMark, The club, a vacation ownership program and part of the Wyndham Worldwide Corporation. The original development partner of the club was Trendwest International (TWI), a subsidiary of Jeld-Wenn Industries, a privately held door and window manufacturer.

Worldmark by Wyndham (WbW), which does not own WorldMark, the club (WMtC or "the Club"), has a dual role for the club. First, WbW develops new properties for the club and sells vacation credits for these properties at a profit. Additionally, WbW manages existing WMtC resort properties, the funds for which come from annual maintenance dues commensurate with the number of vacation credits each WMtC owner's account contains.

Timeline
WorldMark Timeline
 1989: The club, then known as Club Esprit, is founded by Bill Peare, with TWI as developer.
 1991: The Club Esprit name is dropped due to a trademark conflict with a similarly named manufacturer of clothing.
 1993: Club Esprit officially renamed WorldMark, The club.
 1998: Trendwest is spun off from Jeld-Wen, and Trendwest filed to become a closely held company recognized by the NYSE. At this time Jeld-Wen owned 80% of TrendWest, with the remaining being owned by TrendWest Management.
 May 2002: Cendant Corp. acquires Jeld-Wen’s interest in Trendwest. 
 July 2002: By this time all shares in Trendwest had been tendered, and Trendwest became a wholly owned subsidiary of Cendant Corp, and part of the Wyndham WorldWide brand.
 April 2006: Cendant Corp spins off Wyndham WorldWide as a separate entity.
 April 2007: Wyndham WorldWide renames Trendwest (TWI) as WorldMark by Wyndham.

See also
 Wyndham Vacation Resorts, another timeshare company that is a division of Wyndham Worldwide.
 Resort Condominiums International, another timeshare company that is a division of Wyndham Worldwide.

References

Further reading

External links
 WorldMark by Wyndham

Wyndham brands
Timeshare chains